The Papua New Guinea cricket team toured Oman in September 2021 to play two One Day International (ODI) matches against Nepal and two ODI matches against the United States. The matches were used as preparation for all three teams ahead of the Cricket World Cup League 2 series, also in Oman, which started on 13 September 2021 and 25 September 2021 respectively.

In the first round of matches, the United States beat Papua New Guinea by seven wickets, with Nepal beating Papua New Guinea by two wickets in the second match. The United States won their second match against Papua New Guinea by 134 runs, with Jaskaran Malhotra scoring the first century for the United States in an ODI match. The final match saw Nepal beat Papua New Guinea by 151 runs, leaving Papua New Guinea winless across all four matches.

Squads

The United States also named Kyle Phillip as a travelling reserve player for the tour.

United States vs Papua New Guinea

1st ODI

2nd ODI

Nepal vs Papua New Guinea

1st ODI

2nd ODI

References

External links
 Series home (USA matches) at ESPN Cricinfo
 Series home (Nepal matches) at ESPN Cricinfo

2021 in Nepalese cricket
2021 in Papua New Guinean cricket
2021 in American cricket
International cricket competitions in 2021–22
Nepalese cricket tours abroad